Beverly Ann Johnson (born October 13, 1952) is an American model, actress, singer, and businesswoman. Johnson rose to fame when she became the first black model to appear on the cover of American Vogue in August 1974. Donyale Luna was the first black model to appear on the cover of Brittish Vogue in 1966. In 1975, Johnson became the first black woman to appear on the cover of the French edition of Elle. In 2012, Johnson was the star of the reality series Beverly's Full House that aired on the Oprah Winfrey Network (OWN). The New York Times named Johnson one of the 20th century's most influential people in fashion in 2008.

Early life and career
Born the first of two children to Gloria Johnson, a surgical technician, Johnson was raised in a middle-class family in Buffalo, New York. During her youth, Johnson was a champion swimmer and aspired to be a lawyer. Johnson attended Bennett High School, graduating in 1969. After high school, Johnson went on to study criminal justice at Northeastern University. While in college, Johnson tried modeling while on summer break in 1971. She quickly landed an assignment with Glamour and began working steadily. She went on to appear on more than 500 magazine covers, including the August 1974 issue of Vogue, becoming the magazine's first African-American cover model for the US edition, after Donyale Luna's 1966 British Vogue cover.  Her appearance on the cover changed the beauty ideal in US fashion, and by 1975, every major American fashion designer had begun using African-American models.

In addition to modeling, Johnson has also written the books Beverly Johnson's Guide to a Life of Health and Beauty and True Beauty: Secrets of Radiant Beauty for Women of Every Age and Color. Johnson's acting career consists of roles in the films Ashanti (1979), The Meteor Man (1993), Def Jam's How to Be a Player (1997), and Crossroads (2002). She has appeared in guest spots on 7 television series, including Martin (TV series), Law & Order, Lois & Clark: The New Adventures of Superman, The Parent 'Hood and the Super Bowl episode of 3rd Rock from the Sun (1998). She served for two seasons as a celebrity judge on the TV Land series She's Got the Look, a reality series, where women aged over 35 compete for a modeling contract and magazine spread. At the start of the series in 2008, Johnson shared that she and other models had suffered from anorexia and bulimia during her career. She had a brief singing career, releasing one album in 1979 on Buddah Records. Johnson has been a longtime hair and beauty influencer.

Johnson received the Women's Entrepreneurship Day Organization’s Model Pioneer Award at the United Nations in 2022, celebrating her as a trailblazer and innovator in her field. The prestigious award, also recognized by the US Congress, highlights women entrepreneurs and the meaningful impact they are having on the world.

Memoir and accusation against Bill Cosby

In late 2014, she wrote an article for Vanity Fair in which she accused Bill Cosby of drugging her in a meeting at his Manhattan residence in the 1980s, although the incident did not result in a sexual assault. Johnson said that Cosby spiked a cup of cappuccino with an unknown drug. As she felt her "body go completely limp," she realized what was happening. Johnson said she then screamed and cursed at him several times before Cosby got angry and dragged her outside and hailed a cab for her. Johnson decided to tell her story in hopes that "by going public" she would "encourage anyone [who] has been sexually victimized to speak out." Her memoir, The Face That Changed It All, which discusses the Cosby incident, was released on August 25, 2015.

Subsequently, Cosby started a defamation lawsuit against Johnson, alleging that she was lying about the drugging incident and contending that Johnson's story, first told in the Vanity Fair article, had been repeated in numerous interviews. It seeks unspecified damages and an injunction preventing the model from repeating her claims and requests they be removed from Johnson's memoir. A friend of Johnson said, "She expected this to happen. She didn't seem upset 'with the news', but I think she's prepared to counter-sue." Cosby dropped the lawsuit on February 19, 2016, allegedly to devote more time to his criminal case.

Personal life
Johnson has been married twice. Her first marriage was to real estate agent Billy Potter in 1971, later divorcing in 1974. On May 8, 1977, Johnson, then aged 25, married 40-year-old businessman and music producer Danny Sims. She gave birth to their daughter, Anansa Sims on December 27, 1978, in New York City. Johnson and Sims divorced in 1979. Johnson and actor Chris Noth were in a five-year relationship until 1995. She filed a restraining order against Noth, accusing him of physical, verbal and racial abuse.

Filmography

Film

Television

Discography

Albums
 Don't Lose The Feeling (1979)

Singles
 "Don't Lose The Feeling" (1979)
 "Don't Run for a Cover" (1979)

See also
 Liberian Girl

References

External links

 
 
 
 
 Beverly Johnson on Tvland.com

1952 births
Living people
Female models from New York (state)
African-American female models
American female models
African-American models
American film actresses
American television actresses
African-American actresses
Participants in American reality television series
Actresses from Buffalo, New York
Northeastern University alumni
20th-century American actresses
20th-century African-American women
20th-century African-American people
21st-century African-American people
21st-century African-American women